Fractured Freedom: A Prison Memoir is a book was written by Kobad Ghandy. The book is divided into three part, first part Motivation and drive behind Action and Second part A Decade in India's Prisons, and the third part Contemplation and consideration of justification. It was published on 16 March 2021 by Roli Books.

Critical reception

English Version
Kobad Ghandy's writing met with critical acclaim. Mahmood Farooqui of Hindustan Times wrote "The importance of this memoir and of being Kobad lies in shedding privilege, in adopting poverty and struggle, in choosing the right life, in suffering wrongs for it, and yet remaining steadfast. Fractured Freedom is a moral lesson for modern India, which both the Left and the Right would do well to heed". Asim Ali of The Telegraph wrote "This is a sincere and lucid book, mercifully free of intellectual jargon or literary pretensions. It is also deeply moving at times, particularly when Ghandy writes about his wife. Whatever one makes of Ghandy's ideas, there are some important insights to be gleaned from his dramatic life".

Marathi Version
Sukumar Shidore of Loksatta wrote "As the content of the book is multi-dimensional, it is hoped that the discerning reader will delve into its various aspects". Milind Champanerkar of The Wire wrote "Considering the singular images of 'gunmen, burakhadhari', it seems that this book can provide a lot of insight into the reality, breaking through the myths about the extreme left".

Controversy 

The Government of Maharashtra has withdrawn the literature award given by the state government for the Marathi translation of author Kobad Ghandy's original English book 'Fractured Freedom', citing objections that the book 'Promote violence of Naxalism'. There has been a strong reaction in the Marathi literature circle. Anand Karandikar, Shared Baviskar, awardees of the same list this year have announced to return their awards; So, some members of the committee that selects the award-winning books have resigned from the committee.

References

External links 
 

2021 non-fiction books
Indian non-fiction books